Mount Longhu (Gan: Lung-fu San) is located in Yingtan, Jiangxi, China. It is famous for being one of the birthplaces of Taoism, with many Taoist temples built upon the mountainside.  It is particularly important to the Zhengyi Dao as the Shangqing Temple and the Mansion of the Taoist Master (天师府) are located here. It is also known as one of the Four Sacred Mountains of Taoism.

Two notable Taoist temples on Mount Longhu are the temples of Immortal City and Zheng Yi, both founded by Zhang Daoling, the Han Dynasty founder of the religion. There are more Taoist temples in nearby Shangqing, one of which is mentioned in the beginning of the famous Chinese famous traditional novel Outlaws of the Marsh.

Mount Longhu also has cultural significance as a historical burial site of the Guyue people, who placed the deceased in hanging coffins on the mountains cliff faces.

In August 2010 UNESCO inscribed Mount Longhu on the World Heritage List as part of the complex of six sites that make up the China Danxia.

Mount Longhu can be reached from the nearby city of Yingtan.

Gallery

See also
Mount Lu
Jinggang Mountains

References

Sacred places in Taoism
Taoist temples in China
Way of the Celestial Masters
Tourist attractions in Jiangxi
Longhu
Global Geoparks Network members
Landforms of Jiangxi
Major National Historical and Cultural Sites in Jiangxi
Longhu
Geoparks in China